Lys was a department of the French First Republic and French First Empire in present-day Belgium. It was named after the river Lys (Leie). It was created on 1 October 1795, when the Austrian Netherlands and the Prince-Bishopric of Liège were officially annexed by the French Republic. Prior to this annexation, its territory was part of the County of Flanders. Its Chef-lieu was Bruges.

The department was subdivided into the following four arrondissements and cantons (as of 1812):

 Bruges: Ardoye, Bruges (5 cantons), Ghistelles, Ostende, Ruysselede, Thielt and Thourout (2 cantons).
 Courtray: Avelghem, Courtray (4 cantons), Haerelbeke, Ingelmunster, Menin, Meulebeke, Moozeele, Oost-roosebeke and Roulers.
 Furnes: Dixmude, Furnes, Haeringhe and Nieuport.
 Ypres: Elverdinge, Hooglede, Messines, Pashendaele, Poperinghe, Wervicq and Ypres (2 cantons).

After Napoleon was defeated in 1814, the department became part of the United Kingdom of the Netherlands. Its territory corresponded perfectly with the present-day Belgian province of West Flanders.

Administration

Prefects
The Prefect was the highest state representative in the department.

General Secretaries
The General Secretary was the deputy to the Prefect.

Subprefects of Bruges
Until 1811, the Prefect also held the office of Subprefect of Bruges.

Subprefects of Courtray

Subprefects of Furnes

Subprefects of Ypres

References

Former departments of France in Belgium
French First Republic
1795 establishments in France
History of West Flanders